Garth Angus Wheatley (28 May 1923	– 4 September 2001) was an English first-class cricketer active 1946–50 who played for Surrey and Oxford University. He was born in Twickenham; died in Uppingham.

Wheatley was educated at Uppingham School and Balliol College, Oxford. After achieving a first-class honours degree and a doctorate he returned to Uppingham in 1951 to teach physics, but was also master-in-charge of cricket for 32 years.

References

1923 births
2001 deaths
English cricketers
Surrey cricketers
Oxford University cricketers
Free Foresters cricketers
People educated at Uppingham School
Alumni of Balliol College, Oxford
Sportspeople from Twickenham
Schoolteachers from London